Sara Fischer  (born 19 September 1979) is a Swedish snowboarder.

She was born in Malung. She competed at the 2002 Winter Olympics, in parallel giant slalom.

References

External links 
 

1979 births
Living people
People from  Malung-Sälen Municipality
Swedish female snowboarders
Olympic snowboarders of Sweden
Snowboarders at the 2002 Winter Olympics
Snowboarders at the 2006 Winter Olympics
Sportspeople from Dalarna County
21st-century Swedish women